Joseph Michael Senser (born August 18, 1956) is an American former professional football player who was a tight end for the Minnesota Vikings of the National Football League (NFL). A 6'4", 240 lbs. tight end from West Chester University, Senser was selected in the 6th round of the 1979 NFL Draft by the Minnesota Vikings. He ranks 3rd in Vikings history among tight ends for catches (165) and touchdowns (16), and earned a berth in the Pro Bowl after the 1981 season. He played in all 16 games in 1981, setting career highs in receptions (79), yards (1,004), yards per catch (12.7) and touchdowns (8)  He was also a onetime leader in NCAA basketball statistics for field goal percentage. A serious knee injury forced Senser to miss the entire 1983 NFL season, but he returned in 1984.

Senser is a 1974 graduate of Milton Hershey School, a home for underprivileged children and the prime benefactor of Milton Hershey's legacy.

Senser was the color commentator for the Minnesota Vikings Radio Network in 1993–94 and from 2001 to 2006. He was hired by WCCO Radio to be the color commentator for University of St. Thomas football (NCAA Division III) broadcasts beginning in 2011.

Senser is part owner of Joe Senser's Restaurant & Sports Theater which has locations in Bloomington and Roseville, Minnesota. He is married with four daughters and one granddaughter. One of his daughters is singer Brittani Senser.

On August 23, 2011, a Mercedes SUV registered to Senser was involved in a fatal hit-and-run accident near the Augsburg University campus in Minneapolis.  On September 2, 2011, the Senser family's attorney released a statement that "the driver in this incident was Ms. Amy Senser", who is his wife. She was convicted of felony criminal vehicular homicide and sentenced to 41 months in prison.

In May 2016, the state attorney general asked the Hershey Trust Company to remove Senser and two other long-serving board members. The attorney general cited "apparent violations" by the firm of a previous agreement to reform.

On November 26, 2016, WCCO television news reported that Senser was undergoing physical therapy for a stroke suffered earlier in the year.

References

External links
 

1956 births
Living people
American men's basketball players
American football tight ends
Minnesota Vikings announcers
Minnesota Vikings players
National Conference Pro Bowl players
National Football League announcers
West Chester Golden Rams football players
West Chester Golden Rams men's basketball players
Basketball players from Philadelphia
Players of American football from Philadelphia
Milton Hershey School alumni